Ruslan Gryschenko (born 4 February 1981 in Simferopol) is a Ukrainian former professional racing cyclist.

Major results

2001
 1st Liège–Bastogne–Liège U23
 1st Flèche Ardennaise
 1st Stage 5 Thüringen Rundfahrt der U23
 3rd  Road race, UCI Under-23 World Road Championships
2002
 1st Giro del Mendrisiotto
 1st Flèche Ardennaise
 1st Stage 3 Giro della Valle d'Aosta
2003
 3rd Gran Premio di Lugano
2005
 1st Piccolo Giro di Lombardia

References

External links

1981 births
Living people
Ukrainian male cyclists
Sportspeople from Simferopol